Oliver Stuenkel is a German-Brazilian political scientist, writer and Associate Professor at FGV's School of International Relations in São Paulo, Brazil. In addition to several books written on emerging powers and global politics  — such as BRICS and the Future of Global Order (2015) and Post-Western World (2016), he is a columnist for EL PAÍS and Americas Quarterly and a frequent commentator in the national and international media on topics related to Brazilian politics and foreign policy, US-China relations and political risk. His articles have appeared in the New York Times, the Financial Times, the Global Times, among others. Besides that, he is a non-resident scholar at the Carnegie Endowment for International Peace in Washington DC, a non-resident fellow at the German think-tank Global Public Policy Institute (GPPi), based in Berlin. He has earned his undergraduate degree from the University of Valencia, and he also holds a Masters in Public Policy from Harvard University. He has obtained his PhD at the University of Duisburg-Essen.

References

Living people
Academic staff of Fundação Getulio Vargas
University of Valencia alumni
University of Duisburg-Essen alumni
Harvard Kennedy School alumni
1982 births
Political commentators